The Las Vegas Blackjacks Rugby Football Club (Las Vegas Blackjacks RFC) was a rugby union team based in Las Vegas, Nevada. They were members of the Southern California Rugby Football Union and competed in the Senior Men's 1st (Red) Division of USA Rugby.

The Blackjacks finished in fourth place at the USA Rugby Nationals - Division I Tournament and won their first SCRFU Regular Season title in 2008.  The Blackjacks won the regular season again in 2009 and made it to the National Final where they lost to the Gentlemen of Aspen.  Redemption was found in 2010 as the boys claimed the nations top prize with a win in the national final against Belmont Shore.

History 
The Las Vegas Rugby Club was established in 1976, following a newspaper advertisement to recruit players for a local rugby club.  The Blackjacks have reached the National Final 4 competition three times since 2006 and were the national runner-up in 2009.  The club finally reached the mountain top as they edged Belmont Shore for the 2010 National Championship.

In 2010, LVRC signed a player development agreement with Top 14 side, Montpellier Hérault RC.  The agreement with Montpellier will have the French side sending young players to play with LVRC during France's offseason, while allowing amateur players with the Blackjacks the opportunity to play top-level professional rugby.

Season-by-season record
Note: W = Wins, L = Losses, D = Draws, Pts = Points, PF = Points for, PA = Points against

Sponsors
The Blackjacks were sponsored by several different companies, including McMullan's Irish Pub, Bugsy's Bar and Grill, and the Megapixel Cafe. Canterbury of New Zealand is the official merchandise supplier of the team in 2012.

Honors

Club Championships
USA Rugby Premier Division
Champions - 2010
2nd Place - 2009
4th Place - 2006
SCRFU Division I
Gainy Cup Champions - 2009
Regular Season Champions - 2008
Playoff Champions - 2008

References

External links 
Official Site
SCRFU Official Site
USA Rugby
Las Vegas Rugby League Facebook
Las Vegas Rugby Union Facebook

American rugby union teams
Sports teams in Las Vegas
Rugby clubs established in 1976
1976 establishments in Nevada